Yelekhovo is a rural locality (a village) in Korotovskoye Rural Settlement, Cherepovetsky District, Vologda Oblast, Russia. The population was 4 as of 2002.

Geography 
Yelekhovo is located 52 km southwest of Cherepovets (the district's administrative centre) by road. Akinkhovo is the nearest rural locality.

References 

Rural localities in Cherepovetsky District